Durantin A is a bio-active coumarinolignoid isolated from the flowering plant Duranta repens.

References 

Coumarinolignoids
O-methylated natural phenols